The Öösh Formation, also known as the Tevsh Formation is a geological formation of Lower Cretaceous strata in Mongolia. Dinosaur remains are among the fossils that have been recovered from the formation. It overlies folded and metamorphosed basement strata of the Gobi region, and is capped by basalt. The succession is around 600 metres thick and consists of red claystones and sandstones, along with black thinly laminated shales. The claystones and sandstones were deposited as part of an alluvial fan system, while the shales were deposited in lakes present in the foot of the fan. Many of the fossils come from the "Cannonball beds", which comprise the lowest 60 metres of the unit and consist of green siltstone.

Vertebrate paleofauna

Dinosaurs

Mammals

Pterosaurs

Squamates

See also 
 List of dinosaur-bearing rock formations

References 

Geologic formations of Mongolia
Lower Cretaceous Series of Asia
Cretaceous Mongolia
Berriasian Stage
Valanginian Stage
Hauterivian Stage
Barremian Stage
Sandstone formations
Conglomerate formations
Siltstone formations
Mudstone formations
Alluvial deposits
Fossiliferous stratigraphic units of Asia
Paleontology in Mongolia
Formations